Vītiņi Parish is an administrative unit of Dobele Municipality, Latvia.

Towns, villages and settlements of Vītiņi parish 

Parishes of Latvia
Dobele Municipality
Semigallia